Elizabeth Taylor was a British-American actress who received numerous accolades throughout her career and is considered to be one of the most popular stars of classical Hollywood cinema, with the American Film Institute naming her the seventh-greatest female screen legend in American film history.

In her six decades-long acting career, Taylor received five nominations for the Academy Award for Best Actress for the films Raintree County (1957), Cat on a Hot Tin Roof (1958), Suddenly, Last Summer (1959), BUtterfield 8 (1960), and Who's Afraid of Virginia Woolf? (1966), winning for these last two features. Her performance in Who's Afraid of Virginia Woolf? also earned her the BAFTA Award for Best British Actress, the National Board of Review Award for Best Actress, and the New York Film Critics Circle Award for Best Actress. Taylor was nominated for four Golden Globe Awards, winning Best Actress in a Motion Picture – Drama for 	Suddenly, Last Summer in 1960. Her other acclaimed performances include Hammersmith Is Out (1972), which won her the Silver Bear for Best Actress at the Berlin International Film Festival, and The Taming of the Shrew (1967) and Zee and Co. (1972), for which she received two David di Donatello Awards for Best Foreign Actress. Taylor made her Broadway debut in a 1981 revival of the Lillian Hellman's play The Little Foxes, which earned her a nomination for the Tony Award for Best Actress in a Play and wins at the Outer Critics Circle Awards and the Theatre World Awards.

For her lifetime achievements, Taylor was honored with the AFI Life Achievement Award, the BAFTA Fellowship, the Cecil B. DeMille Award, the Screen Actors Guild Life Achievement Award, and a medallion at the Kennedy Center Honors. Her humanitarian commitment to the fight against HIV/AIDS was also recognized with several honors, including the Jean Hersholt Humanitarian Award at the Academy Awards, the GLAAD Vanguard Award, and the Presidential Citizens Medal.

Awards and nominations

Honorary awards

Notes

References

External links

Taylor, Elizabeth
Taylor, Elizabeth
Awards